Sady Belén Salinas Ayala (born 27 October 1994) is a Paraguayan footballer who plays as a right back for Deportivo Capiatá and the Paraguay women's national team.

International career
Salinas represented Paraguay at the 2014 FIFA U-20 Women's World Cup. At senior level, she played the 2014 Copa América Femenina. She also played on 4 October 2019 in a 1–1 friendly draw against Venezuela.

References

External links

1994 births
Living people
Women's association football fullbacks
Paraguayan women's footballers
Sportspeople from Asunción
Paraguay women's international footballers
Deportivo Capiatá players
21st-century Paraguayan women
20th-century Paraguayan women